Rebi Balonmano Cuenca is a team of handball based in Cuenca, Spain. It plays in Liga ASOBAL.

History

Balonmano Ciudad Encantada was established in 1989 when acquired the TNT Uniexpress's seat, a team from San Sebastián de los Reyes, Madrid, relocating the team to Cuenca and renaming it as Madrid-Cuenca. Since then, the team has undergone several name changes. Since 2008, they have been playing continuously in the first division, Liga ASOBAL. The team finished fifth in 2018 and qualified for a European cup, the EHF Cup, for the first time. The team reached the final of the Copa del Rey in 2019 and the final of the Supercopa ASOBAL in 2020.

Crest, colours, supporters

Naming history

Kit manufacturers

Kits

Team

Current squad 

Squad for the 2022–23 season

Technical staff
 Head coach:  Lidio Jiménez Carrascosa
 Assistant coach:  Juan Manuel Doldán

Transfers

Transfers for the 2022–23 season

Joining 
  Henrique Teixeira (CB) from  CSM București
  Daniel Neves (LB) from  BM Cisne
  Fraj Ben Tekaya (GK) from  AS Téboulba
  Juan José Fernández (LB) from  Istres Provence Handball
  Diego Vera Chaves (LP) from  CB Burgos

Leaving 
  Davide Bulzamini (LB) to  SSV Brixen Handball
  Martín Ariel Doldan (LP) to  CB Eón Alicante
  Thiago Ponciano (LB) to  US Créteil Handball
  Samuel Ibáñez (GK) to  BM Benidorm
  Hugo López Ortega (LW) to  BM Melilla Sport

Previous squads

Season by season

EHF ranking

Former club members

Notable former players

  David Balaguer (2014-2015)
  Rubén Marchán (2012-2015)
  Ángel Montoro (2018–2019)
  David Rodríguez Carvajal (2008–2010)
  Pedro Rodríguez Álvarez (2008–2011)
  Santiago Baronetto (2018–2020)
  Martín Ariel Doldan (2016–2022)
  Federico Gastón Fernández (2011–2013)
  Juan Pablo Fernández (2012–2013)
  Leonel Maciel (2017–2021)
  Lucas Moscariello (2018–2021)
  Federico Pizarro (2020–)
  Ignacio Pizarro (2022–)
  Pablo Simonet (2011–2013, 2020–)
  Pablo Vainstein (2015-2021)
  Agustín Vidal (2012–2013, 2014–2015, 2016–2017)
  Leonardo Dutra (2017–2020)
  Thiago Ponciano (2015–2022)
  Alexandro Pozzer (2021–)
  Henrique Teixeira (2022–)
  Leonardo Terçariol (2015-2017)
  Krešimir Ivanković (2010–2011)
  Rafael Capote (2009–2011)
  Guillermo Corzo (2011–2013)
  Jorge Pabán (2009–2012)
  Bálint Fekete (2019–2020)
  Davide Bulzamini (2020–2022)
  Vladan Lipovina (2013–2014)
  Vuk Milošević (2013–2014)
  Dawid Nilsson (2008–2010)
  Serhiy Bebeshko (1992–1993)
  Dobrivoje Marković (2008–2011)
  Vladimir Petrić (2008–2009)
  Richard Kappelin (2010–2012)

Former coaches

References

External links
 
 

Spanish handball clubs
Sports teams in Castilla–La Mancha
Liga ASOBAL teams
Handball clubs established in 1989
Sport in Cuenca, Spain
1989 establishments in Spain